Florence Gill (27 July 1877 – 19 February 1965) was a British actress.

In Walt Disney's animated films, Gill made a specialty for 20 years of voicing hens, including Clara Cluck, The Wise Little Hen and other assorted fowl.

Gill was a member of the cast of Uncle Walter's Doghouse on NBC radio. She also voiced Clara Cluck on the 1938 radio show The Mickey Mouse Theater of the Air.

In addition to her animation work, Gill also appeared in live-action films. She performed her musical hen impersonation in front of a radio microphone in two 1935 musical comedies: Every Night at Eight and Here Comes the Band.

Her interment was located at Chapel of the Pines Crematory in Los Angeles, California.

Live-action filmography

Animation filmography

References

External links
 
 Florence Gill in "Every Night at Eight" on YouTube
 Her biography and filmography – in French.

1877 births
1965 deaths
20th-century English actresses
Actresses from London
Burials at Chapel of the Pines Crematory
English film actresses
English voice actresses